Chamundaraja may refer to:

 Chamundaraja (Chahamana dynasty)
 Chamundaraja (Chaulukya dynasty)